Caltoris canaraica, the Kanara swift, is a butterfly belonging to the family Hesperiidae.

Distribution
This skipper is found in Southern India (Kerala, Karnataka Tamilnadu and south-western Andhra Pradesh).

Description

Habitat: Canara (Ward)

Life cycle

Host plants
The larva (caterpillar) has been recorded on Bambusa bambos, Bambusa vulgaris and Pseudoxytenanthera monadelpha.

References

Caltoris
Butterflies of Asia
Butterflies described in 1883
Taxa named by Frederic Moore